Kumiko Okamoto (born February 19, 1965) is a retired female tennis player from Japan, who represented her native country at the 1988 Summer Olympics in Seoul, South Korea). In the doubles competition she partnered Etsuko Inoue.

Okamoto 6 singles and doubles finals. She has won 4 singles titles and 2 doubles titles on the ITF finals.

WTA Career finals

Singles (1 win)

ITF Finals

Singles (4–2)

Doubles (2–4)

External links

References

1965 births
Living people
Japanese female tennis players
Olympic tennis players of Japan
Sportspeople from Osaka
Tennis players at the 1988 Summer Olympics
Universiade medalists in tennis
Universiade silver medalists for Japan
Medalists at the 1983 Summer Universiade
Medalists at the 1997 Summer Universiade
20th-century Japanese women
21st-century Japanese women